James Frazer is the anthropologist and mythology writer James George Frazer.

James Frazer may also refer to:

 Private James Frazer, fictional character in Dad's Army on television

See also 

 James Frazier (disambiguation)
 James Fraser (disambiguation)